Iolanda García Sàez (born 21 June 1975) is a Spanish ski mountaineer. She was born in Sallent de Llobregat (Province of Barcelona).

Selected results 
 2002:
 4th, Spanish Championship team (together with Olga Elena Deyurka)
 2003:
 1st, Spanish Championship team  (together with Cristina Bes Ginesta)
 1st, Spanish Championship single
 4th, European Cup team  (together with Cristina Bes Ginesta
 4th, Spanish Cup
 9th, European Championship team race (together with Cristina Bes Ginesta)
 2004:
 5th, World Championship relay race (together with Emma Roca Rodríguez and Cristina Bes Ginesta)

References 

1975 births
Living people
Ski mountaineers from Catalonia
People from Bages
Sportspeople from the Province of Barcelona
Spanish female ski mountaineers
21st-century Spanish women